The 2003 Individual Ice Speedway World Championship was the 38th edition of the World Championship  The Championship was held as a Grand Prix series over six rounds.

Classification

See also 
 2003 Speedway Grand Prix in classic speedway
 2003 Team Ice Racing World Championship

References 

Ice speedway competitions
World